Eric Gentry is an American football linebacker for the USC Trojans. He previously played for the Arizona State Sun Devils.

High school career
Gentry attended Saints John Neumann and Maria Goretti Catholic High School in Philadelphia, Pennsylvania. He played both linebacker and defensive end in high school. He did not play football his senior year in high school in 2020 due to the Covid-19 pandemic. He committed to Arizona State University to play college football.

College career
As a true freshman at Arizona State in 2021, Gentry played in 12 games and started the final three games. He finished the year with 45 tackles and one sack. After the season, he transferred to the University of Southern California (USC). He was a starter at inside linebacker his first year at USC in 2022.

References

External links
USC Trojans bio

Living people
Players of American football from Philadelphia
American football linebackers
Arizona State Sun Devils football players
USC Trojans football players
Year of birth missing (living people)